Rock'n'Roll Wolf (Mother) is a musical film from 1976 and is a Romanian–Soviet–French co-production.

The storyline is loosely based on the famous plot about the goat and her kids, published as "The Wolf and the Seven Young Kids" in Grimm's Fairy Tales and known to Romanian audience as Ion Creangă's "Capra cu trei iezi" ("The Goat and her Three Kids") and to Russian audience as a folk tale "Волк и семеро козлят" ("The Wolf and the Seven Kids"). In the movie the number of goat kids is five. The script was written by Vasilica Istrate and Yuri Entin, and Elisabeta Bostan directed.

The movie was filmed simultaneously in three languages (Romanian, Russian and English). The cast was formed by dancers from Moscow Circus, Moscow Circus on Ice, and Bolshoi Ballet. In 1977, the movie won the Silver Cup at the Children's Film Festival in Venice.

The film stars Lyudmila Gurchenko as Rada, the goat, Mikhail Boyarsky as Titi Suru, the Wolf, Oleg Popov as the bear, Saveliy Kramarov as the wolf's nephew, George Mihăiță as the donkey, and Florian Pittiș as the parrot.

Plot

Cast 
 Lyudmila Gurchenko: Rada, the goat
 Mikhail Boyarsky: Titi Suru, the wolf
 George Mihăiță: Petrika, the donkey
 Florian Pittiș: the parrot
 Violeta Andrei: the swallow
 Oleg Popov: the bear
 Savely Kramarov: the young wolf
 Valentin Manokhin: Rassul the lynx
 Paula Radulescu: the she-rabbit
 Vasile Mentzel: the rabbit
 Vera Ivleva: the sheep
 Evgeniy Gerchakov: the ram
 Natalya Krachkovskaya: the she-bear
 Marina Polyak: the squirrel

List of songs 
 Dream (introduction) (Мечта (вступление))
 Our beautiful village (Хороша деревня наша)
 Swing (song of the beast) (Качели (песня зверят))
 Dance of the goat and kids (Танец Козы и козлят)
 Oh, the Goat will cry! (Ох, наплачется Коза!)
 The Wolves are bad guys (Волки-бяки)
 They will be afraid of us (Будут бояться нас)
 Dance of the wolf's pack (Танец волчьей стаи)
 Goats' Lullaby (Колыбельная Козы)
 The parrot isn't a fool (song of the parrot)) (Попка - не дурак! (Песня Попугая))
 Ding-dong, I'm your mother (Динь-дон, я ваша мама)
 The disobedient Matei (Непослушный Митяй)
 The fair (Ярмарка)
 Don't be afraid of the distance (song of the swallow)) (Не страшат нас расстоянья (Песня Ласточки))
 The meeting of Matei and the wolf's pack (Встреча Митяя и волчьей стаи)
 Song of the bear (Песня Медведя)
 Duet of the goat and the wolf at the fair (Дуэт Козы и Волка на ярмарке)
 The parrot is a superstar (Попка - суперстар)
 Dance of the donkey and the lamb (Танец Ослёнка и Овечки)
 The pursuit of Matei by the wolf's pack (Погоня волчьей стаи за Митяем)
 The kids today (Пошла молодёжь)
 The goat and the wolf. Song of the wolf) (Коза у Волка. Песня Волка)
 Feud and malice (Вражда и злоба)
 Mummy (Мама)
 Winter (Зима)
 Song of the three/Song of the wolf's pack (Песня троих/Песня волчьей шайки)
 Potpourri on the ice (Попурри на льду)
 Tango of the wolf and the goat (Танго Волка и Козы)
 Song about mother (final) (Песня о маме (финал))

References

External links

Films directed by Elisabeta Bostan
1970s Romanian-language films
1976 films
1970s musical films
Soviet musical films
Russian musical films
Romanian children's films
Soviet multilingual films
1970s Russian-language films
English-language French films
French multilingual films
Romanian multilingual films
1976 multilingual films
1970s French films